The Battle of Rafaniyya occurred in 1133 when Imad al-Din Zengi raided the territory of the Count of Tripoli and met him in battle near Rafaniyya.

In 1133 Turkmen forces looted and attacked the territory of the County of Tripoli. Pons, Count of Tripoli, attempted to defend his dominions, however he was heavily defeated and his countryside was sacked.

References

Battles involving the Zengid dynasty
Battles involving the Seljuk Empire